Menahem Manesh (also spelled Manus, Manish, or Mannusch) ben Isaac Ḥayyut (died 1636) was a Polish rabbi.

He was the son of Rabbi Isaac ben Abraham Ḥayyut, a descendant of a pious Provençal family; his father went to Prague in 1584. It seems that in his younger days, about 1590, he was rabbi of Turobin.

He is the first known rabbi of Wilna, and his tombstone is the oldest in the old Jewish cemetery of that city. The Jewish community of Wilna was established in the last decade of the sixteenth century, and as Abraham Samuel Bacharach of Worms (died 1615) congratulates Ḥayyut on his good position in a far-away place, it is probable that Ḥayyut was really the first rabbi of Wilna.

He is also mentioned in Ephraim Cohen's responsa "Sha'ar Efrayim," and in Moses Jekuthiel Kaufmann's "Leḥem ha-Panim" on Yoreh De'ah, the first reference indicating Ḥayyut's proficiency in geometry.

He died at Wilna about May, 1636.

His grandson was Rabbi Isaac Hayyut.

Works
His only known published work is "Zemirot le-Shabbat," or "Ḳabbalat Shabbat," which appeared in Prague (according to Leopold Zunz, in Lublin) in 1621, but of which only one copy is known to exist.

He was the author of an elegy on the conflagration of Posen and on the death of his brother Samuel, which appeared in his father's "Pene Yiẓḥaḳ" (Kraków, 1591).

The Bodleian Library contains a manuscript work of his, entitled "Derek Temimim", which contains seven commentaries on the section Balaḳ of the Pentateuch and which is included in the Oppenheim collection ("Collectio Davidis," MS. No. 375, Hamburg, 1826).

References

16th-century births
1636 deaths
Polish rabbis
Place of birth unknown
Year of birth unknown